Emidio Recchioni (1864–1934) was an Italian anarchist and businessman who was involved in a 1931 plot against the life of Benito Mussolini. Throughout his life he also participated in the editing of various anarchist newspapers such as Sempre Avanti, L'art. 248, L'Agitazione, La Protesta and L'Adunata dei refrettari.

References

Further reading 
 Bernabei, Alfio (April 1999). "The London Plot to Kill Mussolini". History Today 49:2.

1864 births
1933 deaths
People from Ravenna
Burials at Kensal Green Cemetery
Italian anarchists
Italian anti-fascists